Haslundichilis is a genus of jumping bristletails in the family Machilidae. There are at least two described species in Haslundichilis.

Species
These two species belong to the genus Haslundichilis:
 Haslundichilis afghani Wygodzinsky, 1950
 Haslundichilis hedini

References

Further reading

 
 
 
 
 

Archaeognatha
Articles created by Qbugbot